Ephraim J. "Red" Rocha (September 18, 1923  –  February 13, 2010) was an American professional basketball player and coach.

Basketball

A 6'9" center from Oregon State University, he earned All-Pacific Coast Conference honors in 1945, 1946, and 1947. He was also selected as a 1947 All-American.

Rocha played in the BAA and NBA in the late 1940s and early 1950s.  He represented the Baltimore Bullets in the 1951 NBA All-Star Game, the first NBA All-Star Game. Rocha had 6,362 career points in the NBA and won an NBA title with the Syracuse Nationals in 1955.  The first person from Hawaii to play in the NBA, Rocha still shares, with former teammate Paul Seymour, the NBA record for most minutes in a playoff game with 67.

After his playing days he became a coach, including head coach of the Detroit Pistons from 1958 to 1960.  Rocha also coached the Hawaii Chiefs of the American Basketball League. Rocha then became head coach for the University of Hawaii men's basketball team. At UH, he assembled what is known today as the "Fabulous Five" during the 1970 to 1972 seasons. In 1970, the team advanced to postseason play for the first time in school history. Red also co-founded the Rainbow Classic — an eight-team collegiate men's basketball tournament, with UH hosting the tournament.

Later years
He was inducted into the Oregon Sports Hall of Fame in 1980, and into the Oregon State University Sports Hall of Fame in 1990. Ephraim "Red" Rocha died from cancer on February 13, 2010, in Corvallis, Oregon, at the age of 86.

BAA/NBA career statistics

Regular season

Playoffs

References

External links
 Career stats

1923 births
2010 deaths
All-American college men's basketball players
American Basketball League (1961–62) coaches
American men's basketball coaches
American men's basketball players
Baltimore Bullets (1944–1954) players
Basketball coaches from Hawaii
Basketball players from Hawaii
Centers (basketball)
Detroit Pistons head coaches
Fort Wayne Pistons players
Hawaii Rainbow Warriors basketball coaches
National Basketball Association All-Stars
Oregon State Beavers men's basketball players
People from Hilo, Hawaii
St. Louis Bombers (NBA) players
Syracuse Nationals players
Toronto Huskies draft picks